Adiós Buenos Aires (English language: Goodbye Buenos Aires) is a 1938 Argentine musical film directed and written by Leopoldo Torres Ríos.  The film starred Tito Lusiardo and a 19-year-old Amelia Bence.

The film is a musical about tango dancing, an integral part of Argentine culture. The film followed on from Adiós Argentina another tango based musical released in 1930.

Other cast
Héctor Calcaño
Antonio Capuano
Delia Codebó
Mario Danesi
Floren Delbene
Vicente Forastieri
María Goicoechea
Eduardo González
Ernesto Lecuona
Mario Mario as El guarda del Lacroze
Lely Morel
Esteban Serrador
Ignacio Villa
Ernesto Villegas

External links
 

Argentine musical films
1938 films
1930s Spanish-language films
Tango films
Argentine black-and-white films
Films directed by Leopoldo Torres Ríos
1938 musical films
Films set in Buenos Aires
1930s Argentine films